Wellington East (also historically known as East Wellington or part of Wellington) is a locality in the Murray Mallee on the east (left bank) of the Murray River in South Australia where the river opens into Lake Alexandrina, the largest of the lakes at the end of the Murray-Darling system.

Wellington East is the eastern end of the Wellington Ferry, the furthest downstream crossing of the Murray River on Route B45. It is mostly low-lying land and development is predominantly shacks and holiday homes associated with the river and lagoons. The eastern boundary is the Princes Highway between Tailem Bend and Meningie.

References

Towns in South Australia